HMS Wakeful was a support vessel of the Royal Navy from 1974 to 1987. She was built as an ocean-going tug by Cochrane & Sons, in Selby in 1965, and first served as a Swedish civilian tug under the name Heracles, or a variant thereof.

The ship acted as part of the Fishery Protection Squadron in the North Sea for several years, but was eventually replaced when enough s were available. After a £1.6 million refit at Chatham in 1976, she was assigned to HMS Neptune as a submarine tender, target ship and tug.

She was sold to the Greek firm Hellenic Salvage Tugboats in June 1988, having sailed from Portsmouth for Greece the previous month, on 6 May 1988.

References

Auxiliary ships of the Royal Navy
1965 ships
Ships built in Selby